was the successor to the Great Teaching Institute, which was founded in 1875. In the religious administration of the Meiji era, it is an organization that brings together Shinto factions nationwide. It was a public central institution. Meiji Government set up a Student Dormitory at the Bureau of Shinto Affairs to train priests. It was also an accreditation body of Sect Shinto.

It served a purpose of training kyodo shoku and over time ran into issues over pantheon disputes. This eventually led to the ascension of the Ise sect and the marginalization of the Izumo sect.

In 1882 it was made into a shinto sect itself due to an ordinance demanding the separation of shrine priests and missionaries or theologians, and in 1884 such missionaries of both shinto and Buddhism were suppressed. The Office of Japanese Classics Research was created as a replacement for it.

See also 

 Great Teaching Institute
 Shinto Taikyo
 Kyodo Shoku
 Sect Shinto

References

External links 

 Shinto Taikyo (sect of Shinto) 

Daikyoin
Shinto
State Shinto
Religious policy in Japan
Pages with unreviewed translations